Kangos is a locality situated in Pajala Municipality, Norrbotten County, Sweden with 252 inhabitants in 2010.

References 

Populated places in Pajala Municipality
Norrbotten